The year 2009 saw the first Best of Nollywood Awards, recognising achievement in the Nigerian film industry. Ramsey Nouah won Best Actor, Ini Edo won Best Actress, and Izu Ojukwu won the directors' award.

Major awards 
Winners are emboldened.

References

2009 film awards
2009 in Nigerian cinema
2009
Culture in Lagos State
21st century in Lagos